In Greek mythology, Agathon (/ˈæɡəθɒn/; Ancient Greek: Ἀγάθων) was one of the sons of King Priam of Troy by other women. He was one of the last surviving princes during the Trojan War.

See also
 List of children of Priam

Notes

References 

 Gaius Julius Hyginus, Fabulae from The Myths of Hyginus translated and edited by Mary Grant. University of Kansas Publications in Humanistic Studies. Online version at the Topos Text Project.
 Pseudo-Apollodorus, The Library with an English Translation by Sir James George Frazer, F.B.A., F.R.S. in 2 Volumes, Cambridge, MA, Harvard University Press; London, William Heinemann Ltd. 1921. . Online version at the Perseus Digital Library. Greek text available from the same website.
Princes in Greek mythology
Children of Priam

Trojans